Nicholas Gecks  is a British actor who appeared in Series Four  of Rumpole of the Bailey as his modernising colleague Charles Hearthstoke.

Early life
Gecks was born in Penang, Malaysia in 1952.

Career
Gecks starred as Father Mike in the 1983 film Forever Young. His other film credits include roles in The Wicked Lady (1983), Parting Shots (1999), The Lazarus Child (2005) and Mutant Chronicles (2008).

On television he appeared as Rupert the eccentric artist whose sister goes missing in the first episodes in Television South's The Ruth Rendell Mysteries.

Notes

People from Penang
1952 births
Malaysian male stage actors
Malaysian male film actors
Malaysian male television actors
Living people
British male stage actors
British male film actors
British male television actors